Rïah Sahïltaahk is the twelfth studio album by French rock band Magma, released on 15 September 2014.

Background

The song "Rïah Sahïltaahk" was featured on the band's second studio album 1001° Centigrades in their early period of activity, taking up the entire side one of the LP. The band's leader, Christian Vander, was not satisfied with the final recording present on the album, but relented as other band members found it satisfactory.

For the 45th anniversary of Magma, Vander chose to pursue an alternative take of the song, with new instrumental passages which were not present on the original recording, along with forgoing brass instrumentation in favor of vocal parts.

Track listing

Personnel
 Christian Vander – drums, vocals, percussion, piano
 Stella Vander – vocals
 Isabelle Feuillebois – vocals
 Hervé Aknin – vocals
 Benoit Alziary – vibraphone
 James Mac Gaw – guitar
 Jérémie Ternoy – piano
 Philippe Bussonnet – bass guitar

References 

Magma (band) albums
2014 albums